Tashkichu (Taşkisew) is a rural locality (a village) in Shafranovsky Selsoviet, Alsheyevsky District, Bashkortostan, Russia. The population was 92 as of 2010. There are 3 streets.

Geography 
Tashkichu is located 25 km west of Rayevsky (the district's administrative centre) by road. Karan is the nearest rural locality.

References 

Rural localities in Alsheyevsky District